Bye Bye Blackbird is a studio album by Keith Jarrett's "Standards Trio" recorded in October 1991 as a tribute to Miles Davis, who had died two weeks earlier. After their debut album Standards in 1983, this would be the first and last time that the Standards Trio recorded in a studio. It was released by ECM Records in April 1993.

As in other works by the Keith Jarrett Trio, this is an album mostly consisting of jazz standards. There are, however, two tracks written (or improvised) by the trio for the occasion, as a homage to Davis: "For Miles" and "Blackbird, Bye Bye".

Original notes (for Miles Davis)
Jarrett, Peacock and DeJohnette wrote the following notes on the original CD issue [ECM 1467]:

Reception 

In a review for AllMusic, Richard S. Ginell wrote: "The lonely figure in shadow with a horn on the cover contrasts with the joyous spirit of many of the tracks on this CD, yet there is still a ghostly presence to deal with -- and in keeping with Miles' credo, Jarrett's choice of notes is often more purposefully spare than usual. There is symmetry in the organization of the album, with 'Bye Bye Blackbird' opening and the trio's equally jaunty 'Blackbird, Bye Bye' closing the album, and the interior tracks immediately following the former and preceding the latter are 'You Won't Forget Me' and 'I Thought About You'... As an immediate response to a traumatic event, Jarrett and his colleagues strike the right emotional balance to create one of their more meaningful albums".

The authors of The Penguin Guide to Jazz wrote: "Bye Bye Blackbird is a wonderful record. The choice of material is refreshingly unobvious... and immaculately played, as this group always plays. The two originals... are as intensely felt as anything Jarrett has done in recent years, and the level of abstraction that has crept back into the music is well judged and unobtrusive. DeJohnette performs wonders, changing metre subtly with almost every bar on 'Straight No Chaser.' An excellent record, beautifully packaged."

Writing for Between Sound and Space, Tyran Grillo commented: "Bye Bye Blackbird sits above the rest for its sheer profundity of expression. The Keith Jarrett Trio is, of course, not an outfit to take itself lightly: with an average track length of over eight minutes, we can rest assured that every tune will be carried to conclusions far beyond our reckoning... The title opener welcomes us into a nostalgic world, glimpses of what it must have been like to work with Miles. The high-end musings into which the music evolves speak to the ecstasy that any such musician must have felt at those moments of ethereal access. One cannot help but notice how energetic, for the most part, this session is. Between the swinging 'Straight No Chaser' and 'Butch And Butch,' there's more than enough to get excited about... The sound of this recording is distinctive—compressed and sere. I imagine it was recorded with very little preparation, and the fact that it was later mastered by Jan Erik Kongshaug indicates an absence of engineers when the tracks were laid down. This gives the music an archival ring, reaching back to the atmosphere of the 60s, without which nothing on this heartfelt album would have existed. Whether calculated or not, I appreciate the throwback. One can feel this music on the verge of exploding, looking respectfully, distantly, and with deference to the past. Suitably recorded for a moment-in-time sort of feel, it is like the capsule of a bygone era unearthed in a silent world."

Track listing 
"Bye Bye Blackbird" (Ray Henderson, Mort Dixon) - 11:13
"You Won't Forget Me" (Kermit Goell, Fred Spielman) - 10:46
"Butch and Butch" (Oliver Nelson) - 6:37
"Summer Night" (Al Dubin, Harry Warren) - 6:42
"For Miles" (Jarrett, Peacock, DeJohnette) - 18:43
"Straight No Chaser" (Thelonious Monk) - 6:46
"I Thought About You" (Jimmy Van Heusen, Johnny Mercer) - 4:02
"Blackbird, Bye Bye" (Jarrett, Peacock, DeJohnette) - 3:02

Personnel 
 Keith Jarrett - piano
 Gary Peacock - double bass
 Jack DeJohnette - drums

Production
 Manfred Eicher - executive producer
 Jay Newland - engineer (recording)
 Jan Erik Kongshaug - engineer (mastering)
 Catherine Pichonnier - cover photography
 Dieter Rehm - cover design

References 

1993 albums
Miles Davis tribute albums
ECM Records albums
Keith Jarrett albums
Standards Trio albums
Gary Peacock albums
Jack DeJohnette albums
Albums produced by Manfred Eicher